Göhren may refer to the following places:

Germany
 Göhren (Tramm), a village in the municipality Tramm in the district Ludwigslust-Parchim, Mecklenburg-Vorpommern
 Göhren, Rügen, a municipality in the district Vorpommern-Rügen, Mecklenburg-Vorpommern
 Göhren, Thuringia, a municipality in the district Altenburger Land, Thuringia 

Czech Republic
 Klíny, a village in Most District

See also

 , a Kriegsmarine coastal tanker